Junnar Assembly constituency is one of the 288 Vidhan Sabha (legislative assembly) constituencies of Maharashtra state, western India. This constituency is located in Pune district.

Geographical scope
The constituency consists of Junnar taluka.

Members of Legislative Assembly

References

Assembly constituencies of Pune district
Assembly constituencies of Maharashtra